The 2010 Shreveport mayoral election resulted in the re-election of incumbent Democrat Cedric Glover who defeated Republican Bryan Wooley in the runoff to win a second term in office. The nonpartisan blanket primary was held on October 2, 2010, and as no candidate obtained the required majority, the general election followed on November 2, 2010.

Results

|}

|}

References

Shreveport
Government of Shreveport, Louisiana
2010 Louisiana elections
November 2010 events in the United States